Helmut Sassenbach (born 31 January 1959) is a German coxswain. He won a gold medal at the 1976 World Rowing Championships in Villach with the lightweight men's eight.

References

1959 births
Living people
German male rowers
World Rowing Championships medalists for West Germany
Coxswains (rowing)